Since may refer to:

Places
Sincé, Sucre Department, Colombia
Sińce, West Pomeranian Voivodeship, Poland

Other
Since (film), a 1966 film by Andy Warhol
Since (album), a 1998 album by Richard Buckner
Since (rapper) (born 1992), South Korean rapper